Sir William Glynne, 1st Baronet (20 January 1638 – 8 September 1690) was a Welsh politician.

William was the son of Sir John Glynne, the Lord Chief Justice during the Commonwealth. He was educated at Jesus College, Oxford, taking his degree in 1656, and represented Caernarfon in the Third Protectorate Parliament. Both Sir John and his son went over to the cause of Charles II at the Restoration. William was again returned for Caernarfon during the Convention Parliament, and was subsequently created a baronet, of Bisseter, Oxfordshire, on 20 May 1661. He was selected High Sheriff of Oxfordshire for 1668.

In 1666, Sir William inherited the estate of Hawarden Castle, Flintshire from his father, and served as High Sheriff of Flintshire in 1673. He was deputy lieutenant for Oxfordshire from 1688 to his death and for Caernarvonshire from 1689 to his death.

By his wife Penelope Anderson, Glynne had two surviving sons and two daughters. The sons were:
Sir William Glynne, 2nd Baronet (1663–1721)
Sir Stephen Glynne, 3rd Baronet (1665–1729)

References 

 

1638 births
1690 deaths
Baronets in the Baronetage of England
Members of the Parliament of England (pre-1707) for constituencies in Wales
Alumni of Jesus College, Oxford
High Sheriffs of Flintshire
High Sheriffs of Oxfordshire
English MPs 1659
English MPs 1660
Deputy Lieutenants of Oxfordshire
Deputy Lieutenants of Caernarvonshire
Members of Parliament for Caernarfon